Elizabeth Sara is an American businessperson, currently serving as Chairperson of the National Women's Business Council since July 2018. She was nominated for the position by President Donald Trump.

Career 
Sara earned a bachelor's degree from the State University of New York and a master's degree from the University of Maryland.

Sara has been an executive in a variety of companies, including SpaceWorks Enterprises, LexisNexis, United Press International, Thomson Financial, and Best Marketing, LLC. She has been an adjunct professor at the Smith School of Business and was the board chair of the Dingman Center of Entrepreneurship.

Sara resides in Washington, D.C.

References 

Trump administration personnel
American women in business
Living people
Year of birth missing (living people)
University System of Maryland alumni